Steamboat Resort is a major ski area in the western United States, located in northwestern Colorado at Steamboat Springs. Operated by the Steamboat Ski & Resort Corporation, it is located on Mount Werner, a mountain in the Park Range in the Routt National Forest.  Originally named Storm Mountain ski area, it opened on January 12, 1963.

Of those, 14% are classified as beginner-level, 42% as intermediate, and 44% as advanced. It also contains the Mavericks Superpipe, one of the premier half-pipes in North America. Limited trails available for night skiing began with the 2013–14 season.

In honor of local Olympian Buddy Werner (1936–1964), Storm Mountain was renamed Mount Werner in 1965, and the ski area's name was changed as well. Dallas-based conglomerate LTV purchased Mount Werner ski area in the fall of 1969, rebranded it as "Steamboat" the following summer, and hired world champion and Olympic silver medalist Billy Kidd as director of skiing.

Ownership
In 2017, Steamboat Ski Resort was purchased by Alterra Mountain Company from Intrawest, a Canadian resort management company. Steamboat was one of the seven resorts owned by Intrawest. Prior to Intrawest's ownership, Steamboat was owned by the American Skiing Company. Intrawest purchased the resort at the end of the 2006–07 season.

Mountain statistics

Elevation
Base: 
Summit: 
Vertical Rise:

Trails
Area: 
Trails: 169 total (14% beginner, 42% intermediate, 44% advanced)
Longest Run: "Why Not" ~ 
Terrain Parks: 6 (including Mavericks Superpipe)
Average Annual Snowfall: 

The three lower mountain lifts (the gondola, Thunderhead Express, and Christie Peak Express) service most of the green runs, which include the long Why Not trail from Thunderhead. Blue trails can be found mostly off of these same lifts, plus the two high speed quads on Sunshine Peak, although more funnel to the Sunshine Express lift. A couple of blue runs can also be found from the Four Points, BAR-UE, and Storm Peak Express lifts, as are a few in Morningside Park.

The blue-black runs are scattered about the mountain, but most of them are located off the Pony Express lift in Pioneer Ridge. Black runs can be found off of all five high-speed quads, the highest concentrations are on north Sunshine Peak, most of Storm Peak, Pioneer Ridge, and Morningside Park. The sole double-black runs of the area make up the extreme terrain on Mount Werner.

Slope Aspects
North: 20%
South: 23%
West: 55%
East: 2%

Lifts

Steamboat has 18 lifts, with 5 Magic Carpets.  

According to steamboat.com, plans are in the works to place a high speed six-pack along the Thunderhead lift line.

The $15 million gondola replacement project lasted through the summer of 2019. Some of the helicopter-enabled tower replacements were streamed online, and the lift was extensively tested under load. It opened with fanfare on November 23, 2019 at the start of the winter 2019-2020 season, but broke the next day on November 24 when a main driveshaft sheared (possibly due to unexpected stress during transit from Austria). The manufacturer (Doppelmayr) sent a team from Austria to help with the situation, and the Steamboat lift Ops worked together around the clock to build, ship, and install the replacement part(s). The gondola reopened on December 5th, almost 12 days later.

NCAA Championships
Steamboat has hosted the NCAA Skiing Championships eight times (1968,
1969, 1979, 1993, 2006, 2010, 2016, 2018).

References

External links

Mountain Facts

Alterra Mountain Company
Buildings and structures in Routt County, Colorado
Ski areas and resorts in Colorado
Tourist attractions in Routt County, Colorado
Steamboat Springs, Colorado